Ashraful Islam is an international field hockey player in Bangladesh. He is a player of Bangladesh national field hockey team.

Career

References 

Bangladeshi male field hockey players
Field hockey players at the 2018 Asian Games
Year of birth missing (living people)
Asian Games competitors for Bangladesh
South Asian Games bronze medalists for Bangladesh
South Asian Games medalists in field hockey
Living people